Matthew Petelu Tuiasosopo (born May 10, 1986) is an American former professional baseball utility player and the current manager of the Gwinnett Stripers, the Triple-A affiliate of the Atlanta Braves. He played in Major League Baseball (MLB) for the Seattle Mariners, Detroit Tigers and Atlanta Braves.

Early life
Tuiasosopo played for the Woodinville West Little League at the 1998 Little League Western Regional Tournament in San Bernardino, California. Woodinville West lost to Cypress Federal in a championship game that lasted 7 innings. This is the farthest WWLL has made it into the Little League All Star Tournament.

Tuiasosopo signed a professional baseball contract after graduating from Woodinville High School. Although he chose baseball, Tuiasosopo had a promising high school football career.  He was selected to play in the 2004 U.S. Army All-American Bowl. Before signing as a professional baseball player, he signed a letter of intent to play football at the University of Washington.

Early minor league career
The Seattle Mariners drafted Tuiasosopo 93rd overall in the third round in the 2004 Major League Baseball draft. He began his pro career with the Peoria Mariners in 2004, hitting a solo home run in first career-at bat on July 10. Tuiasosopo hit safely in 18 of 20 games and reached base safely in 19 of 20 games. He had a 13-game hit streak, hitting .467 from July 10–25, and tied for the team lead in home runs with four. On August 5, he was promoted to the Everett AquaSox. At the end of the season, he participated in the 2004 Arizona Instructional League.

In 2005, he was with Seattle's Low-A affiliate, the Wisconsin Timber Rattlers. He hit .276 with three home runs and 45 runs batted in. He was ranked number 36 on Minor League News' annual Fab 50. He recorded a season-high 13-game hitting streak to start the season, batting .423 with eight runs, three doubles, two home runs and 12 RBIs during that time. Tuiasosopo had 27 multi-hit games, three four-hit games and six three-hit games. He hit home runs in back-to-back games on June 9 and 10.

In 2006, he split time between the Mariners' High-A Inland Empire 66ers and Double-A San Antonio Missions affiliates. He batted a combined .248 with two home runs and 44 RBI. He played with the Peoria Javelinas of the Arizona Fall League that fall. He hit .306 with one home run with 34 RBIs, 31 runs scored and five stolen bases in 59 games with Inland Empire but only batted .185 with one home run, 16 runs scored and 10 RBIs with San Antonio.

Tuiasosopo spent the 2007 season with the Double-A West Tenn Diamond Jaxx. He hit .424 with eight runs, five doubles and three RBIs during a season-high 10-game hitting streak from April 5–14. He recorded a double in five consecutive games from April 6-1. He was named to the Southern League All-Star team and later that season played for the Peoria Javelinas in the Arizona Fall League.

At the end of the 2007 campaign Tuiasosopo was rated as the Mariners No. 10 prospect by Baseball America. He was named to the Minor League News Fab 50 again in 2007.

Promotion to the major leagues
Until September 2008 he was playing with the Triple-A Tacoma Rainiers. On September 5, 2008, he collected his first major league hit, a double, against pitcher Andy Pettitte of the New York Yankees while playing for the Seattle Mariners. He finished the 2008 season batting .281 with Tacoma and .159 with the Mariners.

He made the 2009 Opening Day roster for the Mariners. On July 4, 2009 Tuiasosopo made his first rehab start with the AZL Mariners. Tuiasosopo was activated soon after the All-Star break. Tuiasosopo hit two home runs against the Portland Beavers on August 28 helping the Rainiers to their seventh straight victory. He finished the season batting .261 with 11 home runs and 35 RBIs in 59 games for the Rainiers. In four playoff games, he batted .313 with one home run and four RBIs.

On September 13 Tuiasosopo was called up to Seattle after the Rainiers lost in the first round of the playoffs to the Sacramento River Cats. He said this about the playoff experience:

On September 27, during the pre-game show on 710 ESPN Radio, color man Mike Blowers predicted that Tuiasosopo would hit his first major league home run in his second at bat of the game on a 3–1 fastball into the left center field second level of Rogers Centre. Sure enough, in the fifth inning of their game against the Toronto Blue Jays, Tuiasosopo delivered, although the home run went above the left field bullpen on technically what is the first level of the stadium.

Tuiasosopo played in 50 games in the major leagues with the Seattle Mariners during the 2010 season. He played his first major league games at shortstop, first base, and in the outfield.

Tuiasosopo spent the 2011 season with the Triple-A Tacoma Rainiers. Tuiasosopo signed a minor league contract with the New York Mets on January 27, 2012, and spent the season with the Triple-A Buffalo Bisons. Tuiasosopo signed a minor league contract with the Detroit Tigers on December 6, 2012.  

On March 26, 2013, citing an impressive spring that saw Tuiasosopo hit .327 with four home runs and 10 RBIs, Tigers manager Jim Leyland announced that Tuiasosopo had made the major league team. After a good start to the season, Tuiasosopo landed on the 15-day disabled list (DL) on June 21. He returned from the DL on July 5. On the season, Matt appeared in 81 games for the Tigers, hitting .244 with 7 home runs and 30 RBIs.

Return to the minor leagues
In November 2013, Tuiasosopo was claimed off waivers by the Arizona Diamondbacks. On March 20, 2014, Tuiasosopo was again claimed off waivers, this time by the Toronto Blue Jays. He was assigned outright to the Triple-A Buffalo Bisons on March 28, 2014. On June 12, the Blue Jays traded Tuiasosopo to the Chicago White Sox for cash considerations.

On December 16, 2014 Tuiasosopo signed a minor league contract with the Baltimore Orioles. He was released in March 2015 and signed with the Chicago White Sox on April 3, 2015.

On November 24, 2015, Tuiasosopo signed a minor league contract with the Atlanta Braves.

In May 2016, Tuiasosopo was promoted to the major leagues by the Braves, making his debut on May 4. He was designated for assignment on May 9. He resigned on October 21, 2016. He elected free agency on November 6, 2017.

Tuiasosopo spent the entire 2017 season in the minors with the Gwinnett Braves of the Triple-A International League, playing in 114 games. On July 20, he made his first career pitching appearance in his 1,243rd minor league game, striking out two batters in a scoreless ninth inning against the Indianapolis Indians at Coolray Field. 

On May 21, 2018, Tuiasosopo signed with the New Britain Bees of the independent Atlantic League of Professional Baseball. He announced his retirement from professional baseball on August 20, 2018.

Coaching career
Tuiasosopo was named manager of the Rome Braves, the Class A minor league affiliate of the Atlanta Braves, for the 2019 season. He won Atlanta Braves Bobby Cox Award for best Manager in the Atlanta Braves minor league baseball system and was appointed Manager of the Rome Braves during the 2020 season. Tuiasosopo was named the manager of the Triple-A Gwinnett Stripers for the 2021 season.

Personal life
Tuiasosopo is the younger brother of Marques and Zach, and the son of Manu Tuiasosopo. His father and brothers played college football in the Pac-10 Conference; Manu at UCLA and his two older brothers at Washington in Seattle. Their older sister Leslie Gabriel played volleyball at Washington, and is currently an assistant coach for the Huskies under head coach Jim McLaughlin.

Tuiasosopo's brother-in-law is Micah Owings. He is a cousin of Ronaiah Tuiasosopo, perpetrator of the Manti Te'o girlfriend hoax.

References

External links

1986 births
Living people
Sportspeople from Bellevue, Washington
Baseball coaches from Washington (state)
Baseball players from Washington (state)
Liga de Béisbol Profesional Roberto Clemente infielders
Major League Baseball third basemen
Seattle Mariners players
Detroit Tigers players
Atlanta Braves players
Arizona League Mariners players
Everett AquaSox players
Wisconsin Timber Rattlers players
Inland Empire 66ers of San Bernardino players
San Antonio Missions players
West Tennessee Diamond Jaxx players
Tacoma Rainiers players
Buffalo Bisons (minor league) players
Toledo Mud Hens players
Charlotte Knights players
Peoria Javelinas players
Criollos de Caguas players
Leones de Ponce players
Gwinnett Braves players
New Britain Bees players
Minor league baseball managers